Sir Walter Newman Flower (8 July 1879 – 12 March 1964) was an English publisher and author. He transformed the fortunes of the publishing house Cassell & Co, and later became its proprietor. As an author, he published studies of the composers George Frideric Handel, Franz Schubert and (as co-author) Arthur Sullivan. He also edited the million-word journals of Arnold Bennett for publication.

Life and career
Flower was born at Fontmell Magna, Dorset, England.  He was the eldest son of John Walter Flower. After schooling at the Whitgift School he entered the publishing trade in London at the age of 17.

Publishing
Flower trained under Lord Northcliffe at the Harmsworth Press, after which he joined Cassell & Co in 1906. Cassell was at that time in the doldrums, but Flower built up a stable of magazine titles that grew to dominate the British magazine market for many years. In 1912 he was given charge of the book publishing branch of the company, where he brought in such authors as Arnold Bennett, G. K. Chesterton and H. G. Wells.

In 1926, Cassell's magazines were sold to the Amalgamated Press, and Flower raised enough money to buy the book-publishing branch of the company, becoming proprietor and managing director in 1927. In 1938, shortly after receiving a knighthood for services to literature, he retired, but returned during World War II to look after the literary affairs of the company while his successor, his son Desmond, was on active service. Flower commissioned Winston Churchill's A History of the English-Speaking Peoples, which was eventually completed and published during the 1950s. During the war years, Churchill promised Flower that Cassell would be offered anything he later wrote about the war.  The Times described the result, Churchill's The Second World War, as "perhaps the greatest coup of twentieth century publishing."

Writing

Flower was also an author. His life of George Frideric Handel was published in 1923 and reissued in a revised edition in 1959. The book was well received, but later writers on Handel have disputed Flower's portrait of Handel as "sexless and safe". 

In 1927, Flower collaborated with Herbert Sullivan in a biography of the latter's uncle, Sir Arthur Sullivan, his Life and Letters. This too was well received at the time but also suffered later from critical disapproval for sanitising its subject by suppressing evidence of Sullivan's gambling and sexual liaisons. In 1928 Flower published a study of Franz Schubert, and in 1945 and 1950 he published two volumes of memoirs. His largest literary project was to prepare the journals of Arnold Bennett for publication – more than a million words in manuscript to be edited.  Rupert Hart-Davis later commented on "the prudish timidity of their editor, old Newman Flower. According to Hugh Walpole, N. F. was so appalled by much of what he found in the journals that he published only brief extracts, and those the safest."

Personal life
Flower was twice married, first in 1903 to Evelyne Readwin of Wells, Norfolk, with whom he had one son, and second in 1943 to Bridget Downes of Coore, County Clare, Ireland. He died at his home, Tarrant Keynston House, near Blandford, Dorset, aged 84.

Notes

References
Flower, Newman: Through My Garden Gate,  Cassell, London, 1945 
Flower, Newman: Just as it Happened, Cassell, London, 1950 
Hart-Davis, Rupert (ed): The Lyttelton/Hart-Davis Letters Vol 2 John Murray, London, 1979 

1879 births
1964 deaths
British book publishers (people)
People associated with Gilbert and Sullivan
Knights Bachelor
People from Dorset
People educated at Whitgift School